San Andrés–Providencia creole is an English-based creole language spoken in the San Andrés and Providencia Department of Colombia by the native Raizals, very similar to Belize Kriol and Miskito Coastal Creole. Its vocabulary originates in English, its lexifier, but San Andrés–Providencia creole has its own phonetics and many expressions from Spanish and African languages, particularly Kwa languages (especially Twi and Ewe) and Igbo languages. The language is also known as "San Andrés Creole", "Bende" and "Islander Creole English".

Characteristics 

 It marks the time. The auxiliar  (~ben~men) marks a past simple.
 The auxiliars  and  before the sentence is a polite way to ask permission or asking something.
 There is no grammatical distinction for gender.
 Plural is marked with  after the noun.

San Andrés–Providencia Creole is an official language in its territory of influence according to the Colombian Constitution of 1991 that guarantees the rights and protections of languages in the country. The population of the Archipelago of San Andrés, Providencia and Santa Catalina uses three languages (Creole, English and Spanish). English remained in use for liturgical purposes in Baptist churches, but the coming of satellite television and growth of foreign tourism has revived the use of English on the islands. The standard English taught in schools is British English. The presence of migrants from continental Colombia and the travel of young islanders to cities like Barranquilla, Cartagena de Indias and Bogotá for higher education has contributed to the presence of Spanish. However, the interest in preserving the Creole has become very important for locals and Colombians in general. There has been an effort to offer multilingual education in San Andrés and Providencia which includes all three languages.

See also
English-based creole languages
Spanish-based creole languages
Jamaican Patois

References

External links
New Testament books translated into Creole
San Andres Creole English

English-based pidgins and creoles
Languages of Colombia
Creoles of the Americas
Languages of the African diaspora
Spanish language in South America
English language in the Americas